A protested game occurs in baseball when a manager believes that an umpire's decision is in violation of the official rules. In such cases, the manager can raise a protest by informing the umpires, and the game continues to be played "under protest." Protests were allowed in Major League Baseball (MLB) through the 2019 season, after which they were abolished.

Rules 
In Major League Baseball (MLB), protests are governed by Rule 7.04, "Protesting Games".

Through the  season, managers could initiate a protest "because of alleged misapplication of the rules", provided they notified the umpires "at the time the play under protest occurs and before the next pitch, play or attempted play" (in the case of a game-ending play, a protest could be filed with the league office by noon of the next day). A protested game was reviewed and adjudicated by the league president, or the executive vice president of baseball operations, who could order a game resumed (replayed from the point of the protested decision) only if finding the umpire's decision was in violation of the rules  the decision "adversely affected the protesting team’s chances of winning the game." A well-known example of a protested game in MLB was the Pine Tar Incident in 1983, which was the only time that a protested game in the American League was ordered replayed from the point-of-protest. An umpire's judgment call (such as balls and strikes, safe or out, fair or foul) could not be protested.

In , the provision to protest a game was removed, as Rule 7.04 now reads:Protesting a game shall never be permitted, regardless of whether such complaint is based on judgment decisions by the umpire or an allegation that an umpire misapplied these rules or otherwise rendered a decision in violation of these rules.

Upheld protests in MLB 
Upheld protests are a rare event; the below tables list upheld protests in MLB.

Resumed games
Through 2019, the last season during which protests were allowed in MLB, there were only 15 known occurrences of a protest being upheld and the game being resumed from the point at which the protest was raised.

The protesting team in a protested game has gone 9–6 when the game was resumed. Only three teams have protested a game that they did not lose, with two of the games ending tied and one game being called off.

Non-resumed games
There have been other instances of a protest being upheld, with the game not resumed from the point at which the protest was raised. Examples include:

Notes

References

Further reading

Baseball terminology